Dorothy Watson Glisson (May 10, 1912 – April 10, 2001) was the 17th Secretary of State of Florida, serving for six months from 1974 to 1975. She was the first woman to hold a Florida Cabinet post.

Glisson began working in the state elections office in 1951, and became head of the office in 1954. She served in that role for 20 years until July 1974, when Governor Reubin Askew appointed her to fill out the term of Secretary of State Richard Stone. Stone had resigned to focus on campaigning for the U.S. Senate.

Glisson did not intend to run for election in 1974, but rather complete the sixth months remaining in Stone's unexpired term. After her elected successor Bruce Smathers was inaugurated in January 1975, Glisson returned to her previous position as director of the Division of Elections. In January 1976, Askew appointed her secretary of the Department of Professional and Occupational Regulation. She served in that role until July 1978, when she returned to the Department of State as an assistant secretary under Jesse McCrary. In September 1979, she was again appointed director of the Division of Elections, working in that post under George Firestone for more than seven years until her retirement in February 1987.

References

1912 births
2001 deaths
Election people
Florida Democrats
Secretaries of State of Florida
Women in Florida politics
20th-century American women
20th-century American people